Britain's Brainiest Kid is a British television quiz show produced by Celador, which originally aired in a one-off special format on ITV on 9 August 2001, hosted by Carol Vorderman. A subsequent series was aired in late 2002.

2001 special
The original featured four different rounds:

 A set of 12 multiple choice questions, whittling down the number of male contestants from 12 to 3.
 A set of 12 multiple choice questions, whittling down the number of female contestants from 12 to 3.
 A subject-based round, where contestants answered questions on two subjects, this halved the number of competitors to 3.
 A final round, where the remaining 3 contestants were tested on their own specialist subject and that of their fellow finalists

The winner of the original special was Laura Hibbert of North Yorkshire, whose specialist subject was Charles Dickens.

Alex "Brains" Marshall was runner up. Marshall's specialist subject was the United Arab Emirates. Richard "Helium" Thomas came third. His specialist subject was the Plantagenets.

2002 edition
For 2002, the show was resurrected, with ten half-hour heats and qualification to a 90-minute grand final show. The heats were presented by Tess Daly, and the grand final by Carol Vorderman again. There was also a format change in 2002, with tie breakers being replaced by "Codexs" after the mammoth tie-break in the 2001 show. There were also several spin off shows, such as Britain's Brainiest Footballer and Britain's Brainiest Cabbie after the success of the 2001 show. However the 2002 show was not as successful and Celador eventually announced that the series would not return for a third series.

The winner of the 2002 series was Christopher Guerin, from Birmingham (specialist subject: Thomas Becket). He went on to receive three mathematics degrees including one at the University of Cambridge, and as of 2023 is a maths teacher and assistant secondary school principal.

International versions

Legend:
 Original version  
 Currently airing  
 No longer airing  
 Upcoming or returning version

References and notes

External links

Britain's Brainiest Kid 2001 at Celador Productions
Britain's Brainiest Kid 2002 at Celador Productions

ITV game shows
Quiz shows
2000s British game shows
2001 British television series debuts
2002 British television series endings
British children's game shows
Television series about children
Television series by Sony Pictures Television
Television shows shot at Elstree Film Studios